is a river in Hokkaidō, Japan. It traces its source to Mount Poroshiri  in the Hidaka Mountain range, and flows across Rumoi Subprefecture in the west of Hokkaidō and empties into the Sea of Japan. The mouth of the Rumoi River is in the city of Rumoi.

References 

Rivers of Hokkaido
Rivers of Japan